Gárgola is the Spanish word for gargoyle, and may refer to:

Gárgola, prize-winning novel by Spanish author José Antonio Ramírez Lozano, 1984 
La Gárgola 2014 album
Álex Gárgolas reggaeton producer